Gusika is a village on the Huon Peninsula, in Morobe Province, Papua New Guinea. The village was liberated by the Australian Army during World War II in November 1943.

Populated places in Morobe Province